Morgan Lily Gross is an American actress and fashion model. She started modeling internationally at the age of four years and appeared in more than 21 television commercials, and many photoshoots before her role in Henry Poole Is Here as Millie Stupek. Lily had supporting roles in He's Just Not That Into You, as Matthew Gray Gubler's daughter in The Ugly Life of a Beautiful Girl. Her most notable role has been as Lilly Curtis in the apocalyptic film 2012. She acted as young Julianna Baker in the film Flipped based on the novel with the same name by Wendelin van Draanen and as young Raven Darkhölme in X-Men: First Class. Morgan co-starred as Missy in the Hallmark Channel's film Love's Everlasting Courage. Her most recent work includes  Joe Bell, where she starred alongside Mark Wahlberg.

Career
Lily began her acting career at an early age. Her early work includes the 2005 drama film Shards where she played Morgan, and a TV movie,  Welcome to the Jungle Gym (2006) where she played Kylie. In 2007, she guest-starred in CSI: Crime Scene Investigation as Chloe, which led her to more opportunities such as a co-starring role at the age of 8 years. In her first theatrical film Henry Poole Is Here she portrayed Millie Stupek. Morgan's most notable role so far has been in the 2009 disaster film 2012 as Lilly Curtis alongside young actor Liam James. She has also recurred as Bonnie on Shameless. Morgan's current projects up-to-date include Love's Everlasting Courage alongside high-profile actors Wes Brown (actor) and Cheryl Ladd.

Filmography

References

External links
Official website

21st-century American actresses
American child actresses
American child models
Female models from California
American film actresses
Living people
Actresses from Santa Monica, California
Year of birth missing (living people)